Dot Dash Recordings is a collaboration between the two companies - Remote Control Records which provides publicity, marketing and label management while Inertia Distribution looks after distribution and sales.  Dot Dash Recordings was set up by Remote Control Records in mid 2004 as a new label for Australian artists.

The label works exclusively with Australian artists including Methyl Ethel, Client Liaison, Gabriella Cohen, Donny Benet and many more. Previous label artists include Wolf & Cub, Ned Collette, New Buffalo, Deloris, Snowman, St. Helens, Fire! Santa Rosa, Fire!, Cloud Control and Young and Restless.

Artists 
 Methyl Ethel
 Client Liaison
 Donny Benét
 Ryan Downey
 Gabriella Cohen
 Jeremy Neale
 Teeth & Tongue
 Jess Cornelius
 Sui Zhen
 Banoffee
 Total Giovanni
 Milwaukee Banks
 Dorsal Fins
 friendships
 Katz
 HANDSOME
 Sunbeam Sound Machine
 Lost Animal
 Velociraptor

Past artists
 Nightstick
 Young and Restless
 Wolf & Cub
 Ned Collette
 New Buffalo
 Deloris
 Snowman
 St. Helens
 Fire! Santa Rosa, Fire!
 Cloud Control

See also
 List of record labels

External links 
Official Site
Myspace website

Australian independent record labels
Indie rock record labels
Record labels established in 2004